Morgan Smith may refer to:

People
Morgan Smith (rugby league) (born 1998), English rugby league player
Morgan Lewis Smith (1822–1874),  Union general in the American Civil War
Morgan Smith (actress) (born 1985), American actress
Morgan Smith (photographer) (1910–1993), New York photographer
Amari Morgan-Smith (born 1989), English footballer
Morgan Smith, known as Mista Mo, host of Buzz (TV series)

Other
S. Morgan Smith, American turbine manufacturing company